The title Baron Badlesmere was created once in the Peerage of England. On 26 October 1309 Bartholomew de Badlesmere, Governor of Bristol Castle, was summoned to Parliament, creating a barony by writ. In 1322, he was attainted and executed for joining the rebellion of the Earl of Lancaster, and the barony was forfeited. In 1328, the attainder was reversed for his heir, Giles de Badlesmere, his only son. On the death of the 2nd Baron in 1338, however, the barony became abeyant between his sisters. The eldest line of  these follows the same line as that of the Baron de Ros.

Barons Badlesmere (1309–1338)
Bartholomew de Badlesmere, 1st Baron Badlesmere (1275–1322) (forfeit 1322)
Giles de Badlesmere, 2nd Baron Badlesmere (1314–1338) (reversed 1328, abeyant 1338)

Sources

References

1309 establishments in England
Abeyant baronies in the Peerage of England
Noble titles created in 1309